Phú Mỹ is a rural commune of Mỏ Cày Bắc District, Bến Tre Province, Vietnam. a commune covers 7.13 km2. In 1999 it had a population of 6,132 and a population density of 860 inhabitants/km2.

References

Communes of Bến Tre province
Populated places in Bến Tre province